Independence Township is a charter township of Oakland County in the U.S. state of Michigan.  The population was 36,686 at the 2020 census.

Independence Township was first organized in 1834.  The township surrounds the city of Clarkston, but the two are administered autonomously after Clarkston incorporated as a city in 1992.  The township is home to the Pine Knob Music Theatre and the Pine Knob Ski Resort.

History 
The first settlers arrived in Independence Township in the mid 1820s and early 1830s, primarily from New Jersey and New York.  The first settler to purchase and settle land in the township was John W. Beardslee (b. 1799, d. 1883), from Sussex County, New Jersey.

Independence Township was named by one of its earliest settlers, Joseph Van Sycle, who came to the area in 1834 from Independence Township, New Jersey.

While initially the township was primarily agricultural, the many lakes in the area were beginning to draw vacationers out of Detroit and other cities.  In 1851, the railroad came through Clarkston, which prompted hotels to be built in the township to accommodate the resort vacationers coming to the area. 
 
The invention of the automobile had a tremendous effect on Independence Township. Roads that were once Native American trails were paved and widened for this new mode of transportation. The old Saginaw Trail, now known as Dixie Highway, was paved as early as 1920, and Main Street (M-15) in Clarkston was paved around 1922.

The expanding national highway system brought I-75 through Independence Township in 1962, spurring both business and residential development.  Many farms gave way to subdivisions and strip malls as Independence Township continued evolving into part of Metropolitan Detroit.

Geography

Major highways
 runs diagonally east–west through the southern portion of the township and has two access points at exit 89 (Sashabaw Road) and exit 91 (M-15).
 runs briefly south–north through the southwest corner of the township and has its eastern terminus just to the west in Springfield Township.
 runs north beginning at Dixie Highway and passes through the city of Clarkston. It is known as Main Street near Clarkston and Ortonville Road north of Clarkston.

Education

Independence Township is primarily serviced by the Clarkston Community Schools.

In 2016, Clarkston High School had an enrollment of 1,930 students in grade nine through twelve.  The school is located at 6093 Flemings Lake Road in Independence Township.

Clarkston High School offers twenty-six varsity sports, and competes in the Oakland Activities Association.  It is a member of the Michigan High School Athletic Association.

Renaissance High School is located at 6558 Waldon Road in Independence Township.  Renaissance High School is for students in grades 9 to 12 who need an alternative to the traditional high school setting in order to be successful.  Renaissance students must meet Clarkston High School graduation requirements and receive a Clarkston High School diploma. Renaissance students are encouraged to participate in athletics, clubs and extracurricular activities offered at Clarkston High School.  Renaissance students can also take courses at the Oakland Schools Campus, whose Northwest campus is also located in the township at 8211 Big Lake Road.

Clarkston Junior High School is located at 6595 Waldon Road in Clarkston.  The school teaches eight and ninth grades.

Sashabaw Middle School is located at 5565 Pine Knob Lane in Independence Township.  The school teaches sixth and seventh grades.

There are five public elementary schools in Independence Township:
 
Bailey Lake Elementary School  
Clarkston Elementary School  
Independence Elementary School  
North Sashabaw Elementary School  
Pine Knob Elementary School

Everest Academy and High School is a private Roman Catholic high school also located in the township at 5935 Clarkston Road in Independence Township. The school competes athletically in the Catholic High School League and is a member of the Michigan High School Athletic Association.

Golf

Independence Township is home to three public golf courses; Fountains Golf Golf Club, an 18-hole course  located at 6060 Maybee Road in Independence Township, Pine Knob Golf Club, a 27-hole course, located at 5580 Waldon Road in Independence Township, and Shepherd's Hollow Golf Club, a 27- hole championship course rated 42nd best golf course in the United States by Golf Magazine.  It is located at 9085 Big Lake Road in Independence Township.

Oakhurst Golf and Country Club is a private club, located at 7000 Oakhurst Lane
in Independence Township.  Oakhurst was the home of the 99th Michigan Amateur

Skiing and music

Pine Knob is a ski resort located in Independence Township. It features 17 trails and 12 lifts. It is known for its slope called "The Wall".

Pine Knob is also home to the Pine Knob Music Theatre, an outdoor amphitheater concert venue that has featured hundreds of celebrities and is always one of the highest grossing outdoor amphitheaters in the United States. It is located in Independence Township minutes away from downtown Clarkston.

Hills and lakes

Independence Township is located along the Hillsdale-Lapeer Moraine Range.  The highest hill along that range in Independence Township is Pine Knob, at 1,221 feet.  It is also the highest point in Southeastern Michigan.  Only three miles away is Waterford Hill, the second highest hill in Independence Township with an elevation of 1,150 feet. Atop Waterford Hill is Olympus Circle, the highest elevation of any residential street in Independence Township.

The Clinton River winds its way through Independence Township creating more than thirty named lakes of all sizes along the way.

Demographics

The population of Independence Township was 34,681 at the 2010 census.

In Independence Township in 2010, there were:
11,765 households
9,094 families
12,375 housing units
95.84% White
1.22% Asian 
0.84% African American
0.24% Native American
2.75 was the average household size
3.14 was the average family size
27.7% under the age of 18 
6.9% from 18 to 24 
31.7% from 25 to 44 
25.7% from 45 to 64
8.1% who were 65 years of age or older 
$74,992 was the median income

Notable people

This list includes people from the area (Clarkston and Independence Township).
 Valerie Bertinelli, actress
 Tim Birtsas, former MLB player
 Dan Dickerson, radio play-by-play broadcaster for the Detroit Tigers
 Dane Fife, former Indiana University basketball player and current assistant coach at Michigan State University
 Henry Ford, industrialist and founder of the Ford Motor Company.  Maintained a summer home and weekend cottage on Main Street. Ford also owned a mill which operated on the water from what is now called "Mill Pond" in Clarkston. This building still exists in part but has been modernized into a small mall which includes art galleries and office space. He also purchased the old school building on N. Main St. to serve as an apprentice school.
 John Hardon, Jesuit priest, theologian
 Steve Howe, former MLB pitcher, 1980 NL Rookie of the Year (LA Dodgers) 
 Geoff Johns, comic book writer
 Scott Kamieniecki, former MLB player 
 Tim McCormick, former NBA player and current sports broadcaster
 Bob Miller, former NFL player
 Marisha Pessl, author
 Ryan Riess, professional poker player, 2013 World Series of Poker champion
 Tim Robinson, comedian, former cast member and writer on Saturday Night Live
 Kid Rock, musician
 Ron Serafini, former NHL player
 David Simko, former NASCAR Cup Series driver 
 Samuel William Smith, former member of the United States House of Representatives
 Daniel Travis, actor

References

External links

Official website of the Charter Township of Independence

Townships in Oakland County, Michigan
Charter townships in Michigan
Metro Detroit
Populated places established in 1834
1834 establishments in Michigan Territory